Martyn Goff, CBE (7 June 1923 – 25 March 2015) was a British literary administrator, author, and bookseller. He made a significant contribution to the organisation and popularity of the Booker Prize for many years, and was involved in efforts to increase literacy and book ownership, particularly among children.

Background
Born in 1923, he grew up in Hampstead, London. His father, Jacob Gulkov, was a Russian fur dealer who had emigrated to Britain and became a supplier to department stores. After studying at Clifton College in Bristol, he won a place at Oxford University to study English. Goff was demobilised in 1946.

Personal life and honours
Goff is said to have acquired, and relished, a reputation as a dandy. His partner, Rubio Tapani Lindroos, a Finnish poet who moved to London in 1970, died in 2014.

Goff was appointed an Officer of the Order of the British Empire (OBE) in 1977 and promoted to Commander of the Order of the British Empire (CBE) in 2005. In 2003, Oxford Brookes University awarded him an honorary doctorate.

References

1923 births
2015 deaths
British writers
Royal Air Force personnel of World War II
Writers from London
British booksellers
British arts administrators
Booker Prize
British gay writers
Royal Air Force airmen
Officers of the Order of the British Empire
Commanders of the Order of the British Empire